Merit Club is a private country club in Libertyville, Illinois, a suburb north-northwest of Chicago.

The course was founded in 1992 by Bert Getz Sr. and his family and was collaboratively designed by Getz, Oscar Miles, Bob Lohmann and Ed Oldfield. The course architect was Bob Lohmann. It features a  18-hole course. The Merit Club also has three practice holes: par 4, par 3, and par 4.  

Merit Club hosted the U.S. Women's Open in 2000, won by Karrie Webb.  It was ranked in the top 100 golf courses in the United States by both Golf Week and Golf Magazine.

The Merit Club hosted the second edition of the LPGA UL International Crown on July 21 through July 24, 2016, won by the United States.

The Merit Club has had a caddie program since its opening.  The Current Caddie Master is Rafael Rivera, Jr.  Some notable caddies include: Ben Winkler, Nick Valencia, Jonathan Palmieri, Dillon Leeper, Ethan Porembski, Oscar Vasquez, Griffin Sahr, John Rancourt, brothers Tony, John and Jesse Moore, and Blake Leeper.

References

External links

Golfcourse.com review
Chicago Tribune articles

Golf clubs and courses in Illinois
Buildings and structures in Lake County, Illinois